Cucumber soda is a type of soda made by various manufacturers including Mr. Q Cumber. Pepsi offers an ice cucumber flavor in some markets. It is also made by home soda makers.

See also

 Cucumber juice
 Cucumber sandwich
 Cucumber soup
 List of soft drink flavors

References

Carbonated drinks
Soft drink flavors
Soda